Lindcove is a census-designated place in Tulare County, California, United States.  The population was 406 at the 2010 census.

Geography
According to the United States Census Bureau, the CDP covers an area of 0.7 square miles (1.8 km), all of it land.

Demographics

At the 2010 census Lindcove had a population of 406. The racial makeup of Lindcove was 284 (70.0%) White, 2 (0.5%) African American, 15 (3.7%) Native American, 0 (0.0%) Asian, 0 (0.0%) Pacific Islander, 96 (23.6%) from other races, and 9 (2.2%) from two or more races. Hispanic or Latino of any race were 197 people (48.5%).

The whole population lived in households, no one lived in non-institutionalized group quarters and no one was institutionalized.

There were 128 households, 43 (33.6%) had children under the age of 18 living in them, 68 (53.1%) were opposite-sex married couples living together, 20 (15.6%) had a female householder with no husband present, 12 (9.4%) had a male householder with no wife present.  There were 9 (7.0%) unmarried opposite-sex partnerships, and 2 (1.6%) same-sex married couples or partnerships. 19 households (14.8%) were one person and 5 (3.9%) had someone living alone who was 65 or older. The average household size was 3.17.  There were 100 families (78.1% of households); the average family size was 3.56.

The age distribution was 106 people (26.1%) under the age of 18, 34 people (8.4%) aged 18 to 24, 90 people (22.2%) aged 25 to 44, 113 people (27.8%) aged 45 to 64, and 63 people (15.5%) who were 65 or older.  The median age was 34.7 years. For every 100 females, there were 106.1 males.  For every 100 females age 18 and over, there were 114.3 males.

There were 140 housing units at an average density of 205.2 per square mile, of the occupied units 84 (65.6%) were owner-occupied and 44 (34.4%) were rented. The homeowner vacancy rate was 3.4%; the rental vacancy rate was 4.3%.  273 people (67.2% of the population) lived in owner-occupied housing units and 133 people (32.8%) lived in rental housing units.

References

Census-designated places in Tulare County, California
Census-designated places in California